The County of Talbot is one of the 37 counties of Victoria which are part of the cadastral divisions of Australia, used for land titles. It is located to the north of Ballarat, and includes Castlemaine. The county was proclaimed in 1849.

Parishes 
Parishes include:
 Addington
 Amherst
 Ascot
 Baringhup
 Beckworth
 Bradford
 Bullarook
 Bullarto
 Bung Bong
 Burke
 Campbelltown
 Caralulup
 Carisbrook
 Castlemaine
 Chewton
 Clunes
 Coliban
 Craigie
 Creswick
 Drummond
 Eddington
 Edgecombe
 Eglinton
 Elphinstone
 Ercildoun
 Faraday
 Franklin
 Fryers
 Glendaruel 
 Glengower
 Glenlyon
 Guildford
 Harcourt
 Hawkestone
 Holcombe
 Lexton
 Lillicur
 Maldon
 Maryborough
 Moolort
 Muckleford
 Neereman
 Rodborough
 Sandon
 Smeaton
 Spring Hill
 Strangeways
 Sutton Grange
 Tarrengower
 Tourello
 Walmer
 Wombat
 Yandoit

References
Vicnames, place name details
Research aids, Victoria 1910
Map of Talbot, Victoria showing county boundaries, parish boundaries, main roads, telegraph lines and railways., 1866, National Library of Australia

Counties of Victoria (Australia)